Rory Arnold (born 1 July 1990) is an Australian professional rugby union player. He played for the Stade Toulousain in the Top 14 competition, and has represented  in test matches. His regular position is lock.

Family and early life
Rory Arnold and his identical twin Richie were born in Wagga Wagga, Australia. Their father Tony was stationed there while in the army. The brothers were raised in Murwillumbah in northern New South Wales where they both played junior rugby league until aged 16. In 2010, Rory joined the Murwillumbah rugby club where he played for two seasons before being scouted by the Gold Coast Breakers. (now Bond University Rugby Club). The brothers have Māori heritage on their mothers side

Rugby career
Arnold played Premier Rugby for the Breakers in 2013 and was selected in the Combined New South Wales–Queensland Country side that faced the British & Irish Lions during their 2013 tour to Australia, coming on as a late substitute.

He joined South African side  for the 2013 Currie Cup Premier Division competition. Arnold scored a try in his opening match and was accused of biting a defender when scoring it. He was initially suspended but the charge was overturned and annulled on appeal.

Arnold underwent a shoulder reconstruction and sat out most of the 2014 season before joining the University of Canberra Vikings in the inaugural National Rugby Championship. He was included in the  squad for the 2015 Super Rugby season. , Arnold was among the tallest players in Super Rugby, behind South African lock JP du Preez at 1 cm taller.

He leaves the Stade Toulousain in 2022 to continue his career in Japan.

Wallabies
In 2016, Arnold was named in the Wallabies preliminary 39-man squad for the 2016 series against England. He played two tests in the series.

Super Rugby statistics

References

External links
 Statistics on It's Rugby

1990 births
Living people
Australian rugby union players
Australian expatriate rugby union players
Australian expatriate sportspeople in South Africa
Expatriate rugby union players in South Africa
Griquas (rugby union) players
Canberra Vikings players
Rugby union locks
ACT Brumbies players
Australia international rugby union players
New Zealand Māori rugby union players
New Zealand rugby union players
Rugby union players from Wagga Wagga
Australian expatriate sportspeople in France
Expatriate rugby union players in France
Stade Toulousain players
Twin sportspeople
Identical twins 
Australian twins